G292.0+01.8 is a supernova remnant located in the constellation Centaurus. It first gained notice as a strong radio source, and eventually deep images revealed a hot optical nebula at the location. It lies about 15,000 light years away.
 
The remnant's spectrum shows no detectable lines of hydrogen and helium and the presence of only oxygen and neon. The assumption is that a massive star burned through its hydrogen, producing oxygen and neon, and exploded before processing any heavier elements. It must have taken place relatively recently, as the oxygen and neon have not yet mixed with the interstellar hydrogen. An upper limit of 1500 years has been suggested, and it must be at least a few hundred years old since there are no records from the European presence in the southern hemisphere noting a supernova at this location.

See also
 Crab Nebula
 Pulsar wind nebula

Sources
Murdin, Paul, and David Allen, Catalog of the Universe, pp. 155–156, © 1979 Reference International Publishers Limited.

External links
 Simbad
 1RXS J112427.9-591538
 Imagem SNR G292.0+01.8

Supernova remnants
Centaurus (constellation)